Patrícia Melo (born 1962 in São Paulo) is a Brazilian author. She has written The Killer and In Praise of Lies, among others. Her works have dealt with sex and violence in a heavily urbanized setting.

Books published

Filmography
Traição (1998) - screenwriter of the segment "Cachorro!"
Bufo & Spallanzani (2001) - screenwriter
O Xangô de Baker Street (2001) - screenwriter
O Homem do Ano (2003) - based on her bookO Matador

References 

1962 births
Living people
20th-century Brazilian dramatists and playwrights
Brazilian women novelists
20th-century Brazilian novelists
Converts to Judaism
Jewish Brazilian writers
Writers from São Paulo
Brazilian columnists
Brazilian crime fiction writers
Brazilian women columnists
20th-century Brazilian women writers
21st-century Brazilian dramatists and playwrights
21st-century Brazilian novelists
21st-century Brazilian women writers